This is a list of the Chairmen of Wiltshire County Council and its successor, Wiltshire Council.

Indefinite term of office
1889–1896: John Thynne, 4th Marquess of Bath
1896–1906: Lord Edmond Fitzmaurice MP
1906–1946: Thomas Henry Thynne, 5th Marquess of Bath
1946–1949: Colonel R. W. Awdry CBE
1949–1960: Alderman J. L. Calderwood CBE
1960–1969: Major S. V. Christie-Miller CBE
1969–1973: Sir Henry Langton, later Calley DL DFC DSO
1973–1980: Group Captain Frank Willan CBE DFC DL
1980–1985: Nigel James Moffat Anderson MC DL
1985–1986: Captain P. S. Beale RN
1986–1989: Mr J. B. Ainslie OBE
1989–1992: Mrs Mary E. Salisbury CBE DL

Chairmen for one year

1992–1993: Mrs Marjorie Whitworth
1993–1994: Mrs Patricia Rugg
1994–1995: Mr Percy L. Jefferies
1995–1996: Mrs Dorothea Joan Main
1996–1997: Mrs June Wood
1997–1998: Mrs Grace Hill
1998–1999: Mrs Beryl M. Jay
1999–2000: Brigadier Robert Baddeley
2000–2001: Lt. Colonel D. B. W. Jarvis
2001–2002: Mr J. P. Johnson
2002–2003: Mrs Carole Soden
2003–2004: Mr Jerry Willmott
2004–2005: Mr Allan Peach
2005–2006: Mr Bill Moss
2006–2007: Mr Kevin Wren
2007–2008: Mrs Judy Seager
2008–2009: Brigadier Robert Hall

Chairmen of Wiltshire Council
2009–2012: Brigadier Robert Hall
2012–2014: Mrs Christine Crisp
2014–2015: Roy While
2015–2017:  Richard Britton
2017–2019: Alison Bucknell
2019–2020: James Sheppard
2020–2021: Richard Gamble
2021– : Stuart Wheeler

References

Wiltshire County Council, Clerk's Department at nationalarchives.gov.uk

Wiltshire County Council chairmen
Chairmen of Wiltshire County Council
 
Chairmen of Wiltshire County Council
Wiltshire County Council